Father Gerard Redmond Community Catholic School was named after Father Gerard Redmond who presided over Our Lady of the Foothills Parish from 1964 – 1970 and again from 1980 -1983. Fr. Redmond was instrumental in the initial development of a Catholic school system here in Hinton, Alberta beginning officially in 1982. Originally providing education for grades K – 9, it became a K – 12 school in 1999, and in 2005, after extensive renovations, it began its current configuration as a grade 5 – 12 school.

References 

Hinton, Alberta
Educational institutions established in 1982
High schools in Alberta
Middle schools in Alberta
Roman Catholic schools in Alberta
Catholic secondary schools in Alberta
1982 establishments in Alberta